"Lie Lie Lie" is a song by Serj Tankian. The song was released as a single from his debut solo album Elect the Dead. The music video is directed by Martha Colburn.

The music video is available on the iTunes order of Elect the Dead.
The song is characterized by opera singer Ani Maldjian singing: "la la la la la la la la lie lie lie", either with Serj or by herself.

The song is featured in the opening titles of NBC's Fear Itself, a horror anthology show from the creators of Masters of Horror, and can be viewed on the show's main website. Serj has performed the song alongside the Auckland Philharmonic Orchestra live in Auckland for his live album Elect the Dead Symphony.

Track listing

References

2008 singles
Serj Tankian songs
2007 songs
Songs written by Serj Tankian
Reprise Records singles